Marie-Luise "Malu" Dreyer (born 6 February 1961) is a German politician of the Social Democratic Party (SPD) who has served as the 8th and current Minister President of Rhineland-Palatinate since 13 January 2013. She is the first woman to hold this office. She served a one-year-term as the President of the Bundesrat from 1 November 2016 – 2017, which made her the deputy to the President of Germany while in office. She was the second female President of the Bundesrat and the sixth woman holding one of the five highest federal offices in Germany.

Early life and education 
Dreyer was born the second of three children of a principal and a teacher. Following a year as an exchange student at Claremont High School in California in 1977, and her final Abitur exams at the Käthe-Kollwitz-Gymnasium Neustadt in 1980, Dreyer started her English studies and Roman Catholic theology at the University of Mainz. The following year she switched majors to jurisprudence and graduated in both law degrees with the first Staatsexamen in 1987 and the second Staatsexamen three years later with an excellent academic record.

Career 
From 1989, Dreyer worked at the University of Mainz as a research assistant to Professor Hans-Joachim Pflug.  In 1991 she received her appointment as a probationary judge, and later as a prosecutor in Bad Kreuznach.

SPD politician since 1995
Dreyer joined the SPD in 1995 and was mayor of the city of Bad Kreuznach from 1995 to 1997. From 1997 she was head of department for social affairs, youth and housing in the state capital of Mainz. Having served as State Minister of Social Affairs, Labor, Health and Demography since 2002, she was the designated successor of incumbent Minister-president Kurt Beck, who announced his upcoming resignation from the post on 28 September 2012. She was officially elected on 16 January 2013.

As one of Rhineland-Palatinate's representatives at the Bundesrat, Dreyer serves on the Committee on Foreign Affairs and on the Committee on European Union Affairs.

In the negotiations to form a Grand Coalition of Chancellor Angela Merkel's Christian Democrats (CDU together with the Bavarian CSU) and the SPD following the 2013 federal elections, Dreyer was part of the SPD delegation in the working group on cultural and media affairs, led by Michael Kretschmer and Klaus Wowereit.

In the 2016 state elections, Dreyer managed to convert her high personal approval ratings into a 36.2% win against her opponent Julia Klöckner, improving her party's 2011 result by half a percentage point. In electing Dreyer, the electorate voted to keep the SPD in office for their sixth consecutive term.

During her second term in office, Dreyer's government decided to sell the state's 82.5 percent stake in the loss-making Frankfurt–Hahn Airport in western Germany to Chinese conglomerate HNA Group.

In late 2017, SPD members elected Dreyer to the party's national leadership for the first time as a vice chair. In the negotiations to form a fourth coalition government under Merkel following the 2017 federal elections, she led the working group on health policy, alongside Hermann Gröhe and Georg Nüßlein.

Dreyer was nominated by her party as delegate to the Federal Convention for the purpose of electing the President of Germany in 2022.

Political positions
Following the 2017 national elections, Dreyer warned against another grand coalition and favoured a minority government.

Other activities
 ZDF, chairwoman of the Board of Directors, since 2017
 Max Planck Society, Member of the Senate
 Central Committee of German Catholics, Member
 Deutsches Museum, Member of the Board of Trustees
 Friedrich Ebert Foundation (FES), Member
 Fritz Walter Foundation, Member of the Advisory Board
 Stiftung Mainzer Herz, Member of the Board of Trustees
 Stiftung Rheinland-Pfalz für Kultur, chairwoman of the Board of Trustees
 European Foundation for the Speyer Cathedral, Member of the Board of Trustees

Personal life

She was diagnosed with multiple sclerosis in 1994. This inhibits her physical movement. She made her illness public in 2006, and, when travelling she now always takes her "Rolli" (wheelchair) along, for covering longer distances.

References

External links

1961 births
Living people
People from Neustadt an der Weinstraße
Members of the Landtag of Rhineland-Palatinate
Presidents of the German Bundesrat
Social Democratic Party of Germany politicians
People with multiple sclerosis
Ministers-President of Rhineland Palatinate
German Roman Catholics
State ministers of Rhineland-Palatinate
German politicians with disabilities
21st-century German women politicians